In geometry, a polygon with holes is an area-connected planar polygon with one external boundary and one or more interior boundaries (holes). Polygons with holes can be dissected into multiple polygons by adding new edges, so they are not frequently needed.

An ordinary polygon can be called simply-connected, while a polygon-with-holes is multiply-connected. An H-holed-polygon is H-connected.

Degenerate holes
Degenerate cases may be considered, but a well-formed holed-polygon must have no contact between exterior and interior boundaries, or between interior boundaries. Nondegenerate holes should have 3 or more sides, excluding internal point boundaries (monogons) and single edge boundaries (digons).

Boundary orientation
Area fill algorithms in computational lists the external boundary vertices can be listed in counter-clockwise order, and interior boundaries clockwise. This allows the interior area to be defined as left of each edge.

Conversion to ordinary polygon
A polygons with holes can be transformed into an ordinary unicursal boundary path by adding (degenerate) connecting double-edges between boundaries, or by dissecting or triangulating it into 2 or more simple polygons.

In polyhedra

Polygons with holes can be seen as faces in polyhedra, like a cube with a smaller cube externally placed on one of its square faces (augmented), with their common surfaces removed. A toroidal polyhedron can also be defined connecting a holed-face to a holed-faced on the opposite side (excavated). The 1-skeleton (vertices and edges) of a polyhedron with holed-faces is not a connected graph. Each set of connected edges will make a separate polyhedron if their edge-connected holes are replaced with faces.

The Euler characteristic of hole-faced polyhedron is χ = V - E + F = 2(1-g) + H, genus g, for V vertices, E edges, F faces, and H holes in the faces.
Examples

Examples with degenerate holes
A face with a point hole is considered a monogonal hole, adding one vertex, and one edge, and can attached to a degenerate monogonal hosohedron hole, like a cylinder hole with zero radius. A face with a degenerate digon hole adds 2 vertices and 2 coinciding edges, where the two edges attach to two coplanar faces, as a dihedron hole.

References

Polygons
Euclidean plane geometry